Alathur is a village in Pattukkottai taluk of Thanjavur district, Tamil Nadu, India. Alathur village is a division of Musugundha Nadu part of Chola Nadu.It is located approximately eight kilometers from Pattukkottai - Mannargudi  with the well-connected road of State Highway (SH 146) a route called Sethubachathiram Road. It is the third biggest village in pattukkottai taluk after Thamarankottai and Thambikottai. Alathur is an Agricultural community, Commercial market and Centres.

Administration 
 Panchayath Villages: Alathur
 Revenue Villages:
 Alathur
 Musiri
 Vadugankuthagai
 Mahadevapuram

Demographics 
According to the 2011 census, Alathur had a total population of 4733 with 2163 males, 2570 females and 475 children. The literacy rate was 77.05 percent.

Geography 

It is surrounded by Madukur, Alampallam, Sembaloore, Mullur Pattikadu, Thalikottai, Pulavanji, Ambalapattu and Thittakudi. Alathur is a most developed village in Thanjavur district.

A branch of the Kallanikalvai (a canal from Cauvery River) runs through the centre of Alathur, which is surrounded by irrigation canals and water storage areas such as Pudukulam, Pudu Lake, Veeranar kulam, Sivan kovil kulam, Oddai, Nara Panai. This abundance of irrigation supports paddy, coconut farms, sugarcane, etc.

Sri Veeranar ayyanar temple is famous temple in Alathur and also surrounding areas

It has almost all temples within its area such as Lord Sivan temple, Lord Ganapathy, Lord Muruga, and Goddess Kaliamman, MUNIYAPPAN TEMPLE

See also
Sri Malaiperumal Koil
 MUNIYAPPAN KADERIAMMAN KOVIL

References 

Villages in Thanjavur district